

See also 
 Rhode Island's at-large congressional district special election, 1808
 United States House of Representatives elections, 1808 and 1809
 List of United States representatives from Rhode Island

1808
Rhode Island
United States House of Representatives